Ida Kristine Nielsen (born 1975), also known as Bass Ida, Bassida, and Ida Funkhouser, is a Danish bassplayer, composer and vocalist. She is known for being a member of several bands, such as Belgian Zap Mama, Danish pop rock band Michael Learns to Rock, American funk band the New Power Generation, and funk rock trio 3rdeyegirl (2012–present). The latter two were backing bands for Prince.

History 
Nielsen started playing bass at age 16. During 1993–1998 she studied at the Royal Danish Academy of Music and finished her diploma with electric bass as her major instrument.

In 2008 she released her first solo album, Marmelade.

In 2010 Nielsen started working with Prince, and became a member of The New Power Generation as singer and bassist. She later became a part of Prince's musical trio, 3rdeyegirl, alongside guitarist Donna Grantis and drummer Hannah Welton. They toured the UK, Europe and North America, and in 2014 released their only album, Plectrumelectrum.

In 2014 Nielsen released her second album, Sometimes a Girl Needs Some Sugar Too. Her first single, "SHOWMEWHATUGOT" (from her "TurnItUp" album) was hand-picked by Prince to be "Purple pick of the week" on TIDAL when it was released. Nielsen and Prince continued to work together until Prince's death in April 2016. Later that year, she released her third album, TurnItUp in his memory. In an interview with Danish National DR-TV in 2017 she underlined Prince's influence - to her music as well as her life:

"The most important thing Prince taught me was to play with my heart. Always!"

Discography

Album 
 2008 – Marmelade (as: "BassIda")
 2011 – Sometimes a Girl Needs Some Sugar Too
 2016 – Turnitup
 2019 – Time 2 Stop Worrying
 2020 – 02022020

References 

http://www.notreble.com/buzz/2016/08/25/turnitup-an-interview-with-ida-nielsen/

External links 
 TC Electronics Artist 
 Ida Kristine Nielsen at MySpace
 Interview about playing with Prince in major Danish paper Politiken
 Ida Kristine Nielsen's solo discography with album releases and her credits on different albums at Discogs.com

1975 births
Danish bass guitarists
Danish women singers
Danish songwriters
Women bass guitarists
Living people
New Power Generation members
21st-century bass guitarists
3rdeyegirl members